Richard Paul Robertson is a former Major League Baseball pitcher. He pitched six seasons in the major leagues, from  until , all for the San Francisco Giants. In , he led the National League in wild pitches with 18.

Sources

Major League Baseball pitchers
San Francisco Giants players
Phoenix Giants players
Richmond Braves players
Baseball players from California
1944 births
Living people
People from Albany, California
Napa Valley Storm baseball players
Santa Clara Broncos baseball players